Tera Mera Saath Rahen is a 2001 Indian drama film directed by Mahesh V. Manjrekar. The film stars Ajay Devgn, Dushyant Wagh, Sonali Bendre and Namrata Shirodkar.

Plot

Raj Dixit (Ajay Devgn) is a respectable average man who lives with his younger brother Rahul (Dushyant Wagh). Suman (Namrata Shirodkar) and her parents (Shivaji Satam and Reema Lagoo) are his neighbors, somewhat of surrogate parents to him at times. The obstacle in Rahul's life is not Rahul's physical handicap, cerebral palsy, but his imperative need for Raj. Suman is in love with Raj and declares it openly. Raj needs a wife who would be willing to accept Rahul in her life. With her feelings ignored by Raj, Suman begins to date someone else in the neighbourhood, much to the chagrin of her parents, and finally leaves home.

Khanna (Prem Chopra) takes advantage of Raj's quiescent personality and asks him to marry his niece, Madhuri (Sonali Bendre). It doesn't take long before Raj accepts the offer and develops a relationship with Madhuri. Raj explains to Madhuri that their relationship has little room for growth, as lovers anyway. Madhuri is of the opinion that Rahul should be sent to a special school, which Raj strongly detests. Madhuri ends the relationship and beings to avoid Raj.

Raj gets tired of looking after Rahul for 15 years and now wants to have a normal family life. He changes his mind and admits Rahul in a special school. Raj and Madhuri rekindle their relationship. However, Raj begins to miss Rahul and that adversely affects his work. Meanwhile, Suman returns home after a break.
Finally Raj, Madhuri, Rahul lives altogether happily.

Cast
Ajay Devgan as Raj Dixit
Dushyant Wagh as Rahul Dixit, Raj's younger brother 
Sonali Bendre as Madhuri
Namrata Shirodkar as Suman Gupta
Prem Chopra as Mr. Khanna
 Anand Abhyankar
 Kishore Nandalaskar
 Shivaji Satam as Mr. Gupta, Suman's father
 Reema Lagoo as Janki Gupta, Suman's mother 
 Sayaji Shinde
 Swapnil Kamble as Mr. Amit Chauhan

Soundtrack
Music by Anand Raj Anand.

References

External links

2001 films
2000s Hindi-language films
Indian drama films
2001 drama films
Films directed by Mahesh Manjrekar
Films about people with cerebral palsy
Films scored by Anand Raj Anand
Films about disability in India
Hindi-language drama films